"Rat in Mi Kitchen" is a song written and performed by British reggae group UB40. It features Herb Alpert on trumpet and is the sixth track on their album Rat in the Kitchen. Released as a single on 5 January 1987, it reached number 12 on the UK Singles Chart later the same month, staying on the chart for seven weeks.

Although "Rat in Mi Kitchen" is attributed to the whole group, like many UB40 songs, it was written by Astro. At the time, lead singer Ali Campbell had moved into a new home in Balsall Heath, Birmingham and was troubled by rodents. When asked by Astro if he had any ideas for new songs he replied, "Oh God, I don't care about the album for a minute, I've got a rat in the kitchen!" Astro, who sings lead vocals on the song, wrote the track in response.

Charts

Weekly charts

Year-end charts

References 

1986 songs
1987 singles
Songs about mice and rats
UB40 songs